HMS Croxton was a  of the Royal Navy built in 1916. The Racecourse class (also called the Ascot class) comprised 32 paddlewheel coastal minesweeping sloops.

References

Racecourse-class minesweepers
Royal Navy ship names
1916 ships